Naughty Cinderella is a 1933 British comedy film directed by Jean Daumery and starring John Stuart, Winna Winifried and Betty Huntley-Wright. It was produced as a quota quickie by Warner Bros. at the company's Teddington Studios in London.

Cast
 John Stuart as Michael Wynard
 Winna Winifried as Brita Rasmusson
 Betty Huntley-Wright as Elinore
 Marion Gerth as Elsa
 Marie Wright as Mrs Barrow
 Victor Fairley as Herr Amsel
 Catherine Watts as Clara Field

References

Bibliography
 Chibnall, Steve. Quota Quickies: The Birth of the British 'B' Film. British Film Institute, 2007.
 Low, Rachael. Filmmaking in 1930s Britain. George Allen & Unwin, 1985.
 Wood, Linda. British Films, 1927-1939. British Film Institute, 1986.

Bibliography
 Zipes, Jack. The Enchanted Screen: The Unknown History of Fairy-Tale Films. Routledge, 2011.

External links

1933 films
1933 comedy films
Films directed by Jean Daumery
British comedy films
British black-and-white films
1930s English-language films
1930s British films
Quota quickies
Warner Bros. films
Films shot at Teddington Studios